The Shire of Burdekin is a local government area located in North Queensland, Australia in the Dry Tropics region. The district is located between Townsville and Bowen in the delta of the Burdekin River.

History 
Yuru (also known as Juru, Euronbba, Juru, Mal Mal, Malmal) is an Australian Aboriginal language spoken on Yuru country. The Yuru language region includes the landscape within the local government boundaries of the Shire of Burdekin, including the town of Home Hill.
On 16 January 1888, the Ayr Division was created out of Subdivision 3 of the Thuringowa Division in 1888 under the Divisional Boards Act 1887.

With the passage of the Local Authorities Act 1902, Ayr Division became the Shire of Ayr on 31 March 1903.

On 12 June 1982, the Shire of Ayr was renamed the Shire of Burdekin, a change long desired by the residents of Home Hill.

Council members were elected to represent different divisions within the shire until the election of March 1994 at which all council members are elected by all shire residents. The title of Mayor replaced the former title of Shire Chairman and the title of Shire Clerk was replaced by Chief Executive Officer from that same election.

New shire chambers were opened on 9 October 1999. The cost was $2.8 million.

From 2000, council elections were held every four years to elect a mayor and ten councillors. From 2008, this was reduced to a mayor and six councillors.

Facilities 
The public library headquarters of the Burdekin Shire Council Library Services is located at 108 Graham Street, Ayr. The Burdekin Shire also operate a public library in Home Hill at 77-79 Ninth Avenue.  Both libraries opened in 1984.

Towns and localities
The Shire of Burdekin includes the following settlements:

 Airdmillan
 Airville
 Alva
 Ayr
 Barratta
 Brandon
 Carstairs
 Clare
 Colevale
 Cromarty
 Dalbeg
 Eight Mile Creek
 Fredericksfield
 Giru
 Groper Creek
 Home Hill
 Horseshoe Lagoon

 Inkerman
 Jarvisfield
 Jerona
 Kalamia
 Kirknie
 Maidavale
 Majors Creek
 McDesme
 Millaroo
 Mona Park
 Mount Kelly
 Mount Surround
 Mulgrave
 Osborne
 Parkside
 Rangemore
 Rita Island
 Shirbourne
 Swans Lagoon
 Upper Haughton
 Wangaratta
 Wunjunga

Population

Chairmen and mayors

References

 
Local government areas of Queensland
1888 establishments in Australia
North Queensland